KCG may refer to:

 KCG Holdings, an American market-making and electronic trading firm
Knight Capital Group, predecessor firm to KCG Holdings traded as KCG
 Republic of Korea Coast Guard, the coast guard of South Korea
 Kyoto Computer Gakuin, Japan's first private computer educational institution
 Chignik Fisheries Airport, with IATA code KCG
 Kaohsiung City Government, government of Kaohsiung City
 The ISO 693-3 code for the Tyap language